Lorenzo Tedesco (born 30 December 1990) is an Italian lightweight rower. He won a gold medal at the 2017 World Rowing Championships in Sarasota with the lightweight men's four.

References

1990 births
Living people
Italian male rowers
World Rowing Championships medalists for Italy